Richard Allan Baker (born March 18, 1940) was the first Historian of the United States Senate, serving through August 2009. He directed the United States Senate Historical Office from the time of its creation in 1975.

He wrote a weekly column on Senate history for a Washington newspaper (The Hill) and is the co-author (with Neil MacNeil) of the D.B. Hardeman Prize-winning The American Senate: An Insider's History, published in 2013, a history of Senate rules and customs.

Education 
Baker graduated in 1962 from the University of Massachusetts Amherst, and received master's degrees from Columbia University in 1968 and Michigan State University in 1965.  He also obtained a Ph.D. in history from the University of Maryland, College Park in 1982.

Historical Minutes 
Beginning in 1997, at the request of Senate Democratic Leader Thomas Daschle, Baker routinely opened the weekly luncheon meetings of the Democratic Caucus of the United States Senate with a brief historical anecdote or minute. These short essays were wide-ranging in topic and highlight recurring themes in the Senate's institutional development. In 2009, at the time of Baker's retirement, Senate Republican Leader Mitch McConnell initiated a similar program for his party's members.  Both Democratic and Republican programs are currently active, relying on presentations by the Senate's Historian and Associate Historian.

Authorship
 "Conservation Politics: The Senate Career of Clinton P. Anderson" (University of New Mexico Press, 1985)
 "The Senate of the United States: A Bicentennial History" (Krieger, 1988)
 "First Among Equals: Outstanding Senate Leaders of the Twentieth Century" (Congressional Quarterly, 1991) (coeditor)
 "200 Notable Days: Senate Stories 1787 to 2002" (Government Printing Office, 2006) 
 "The American Senate: An Insider's History" co-authored with Neil MacNeil (Oxford University Press, 2013)

External links
 Saving Senate History, via pbs.org November 25, 2002
 Senate Historian Reflects on 34 Years of Unusual Queries, via New York Times August 8, 2009

C-SPAN Q&A interview with Baker, June 12, 2005
C-SPAN Q&A interview with Baker, September 27, 2009
C-SPAN  "Q&A"  interview with Baker, July 7, 2013
 Senate Historical Office oral history interviews 
 Senate briefs

1940 births
Living people
Employees of the United States Senate
University of Maryland, College Park alumni
Columbia University alumni
Michigan State University alumni
University of Massachusetts Amherst alumni
Place of birth missing (living people)
21st-century American historians
21st-century American male writers
Historians of the United States Senate
American male non-fiction writers